Utilising the DW/BI system is the final step before business users gain access to the information. The first impression the business community gets is when introduced to the BI frontend drives. Because acceptance from users is important, the deployment must be thoughtfully planned to ensure that the DW/BI system can perform and deliver the results it is designed to deliver.
To ensure that the implementation can perform and deliver it has to be exposed to extensive end-to-end testing . The process of testing is an ongoing activity along the development process, because defects that should be correct later in the lifecycle are difficult to find and are associated with exponentially increasing costs. A way of securing that the testing is done through the development lifecycle is to follow a methodology.
Kimball prescribe that before adding the DW/BI system, it should have passed a mock test that will cover the following procedures;
 
Testing procedures
Data quality
 Operations process testing
 Performance testing
 Deployment testing
 User desktop readiness.
 Documentation and Training
 Maintenance and Support

References

Business intelligence terms